Jatropha is a genus of flowering plants in the spurge family, Euphorbiaceae. The name is derived from the Greek words ἰατρός (iatros), meaning "physician", and τροφή (trophe), meaning "nutrition", hence the common name physic nut. Another common name is nettlespurge. It contains approximately 170 species of succulent plants, shrubs and trees (some are deciduous, like Jatropha curcas). Most of these are native to the Americas, with 66 species found in the Old World. Plants produce separate male and female flowers. As with many members of the family Euphorbiaceae, Jatropha contains compounds that are highly toxic. Jatropha species have traditionally been used in basketmaking, tanning and dye production. In the 2000s, one species, Jatropha curcas, generated interest as an oil crop for biodiesel production and also medicinal importance when used as lamp oil; native Mexicans in the Veracruz area developed by selective breeding a Jatropha curcas variant lacking the toxic compounds, yielding a better income when used as source for biodiesel, because of its edible byproduct. Toxicity may return if edible Jatropha is pollinated by toxic types.

Uses

The stems of haat (Jatropha cuneata) are used for basketmaking by the Seri people in Sonora, Mexico. The stems are roasted, split and soaked through an elaborate process. The reddish dye that is often used is made from the root of another plant species, Krameria grayi. Spicy jatropha (J. integerrima) is cultivated as an ornamental in the tropics for its continuously blooming crimson flowers. Buddha belly plant (J. podagrica) was used to tan leather and produce a red dye in Mexico and the southwestern United States. It is also used as a house plant.

The oil from Jatropha curcas is mainly converted into biodiesel for use in diesel engines. The cake resulting from oil extraction, a protein-rich product, can be used for fish or animal feed (if detoxified). It is also a biomass feedstock to power electricity plants or to produce biogas, and a high-quality organic fertilizer.

In 2007, Goldman Sachs cited Jatropha curcas as one of the best candidates for future biodiesel production. It is resistant to drought and pests, and produces seeds containing 27-40% oil, averaging 34.4%. The remaining press cake of jatropha seeds after oil extraction could also be considered for energy production. However, despite their abundance and use as oil and reclamation plants, none of the Jatropha species have been properly domesticated and, as a result, their productivity is variable, and the long-term impact of their large-scale use on soil quality and the environment is unknown. 2009 research found that Jatropha biodiesel production requires significantly more water than other common biofuel crops, and that initial yield estimates were high. Earlier, higher estimates from Worldwatch Institute had suggested that 1 acre of cultivation could yield 202 gallons (4.8 barrels) of biodiesel.

Jatropha curcas  is also being studied for use as a carbon sequestration plant in arid regions.

Toxicity
Much like other members of the family Euphorbiaceae, members of the genus Jatropha contain several toxic compounds. The seeds of Jatropha curcas contain the highly poisonous toxalbumin curcin, a lectin dimer. They also contain carcinogenic phorbol. Despite this, the seeds are occasionally eaten after roasting, which reduces some of the toxicity. Its sap is a skin irritant, and ingesting as few as three untreated seeds can be fatal to humans. In 2005, Western Australia banned Jatropha gossypiifolia as invasive and highly toxic to people and animals. It continues to be used as a medicine in certain geographic regions; however one study found the dried leaf to have no anti-fungal activity.

Selected species

 Jatropha acanthophylla Loefgr.
 Jatropha bullockii E.J.Lott
 Jatropha cardiophylla (Torr.) Müll.Arg. – Sangre de Cristo
 Jatropha cathartica Terán & Berland. – Berlandier's nettlespurge
 Jatropha chamelensis Pérez-Jiménez
 Jatropha costaricensis G.L.Webster & Poveda
 Jatropha cinerea (Ortega) Müll.Arg. – Arizona nettlespurge
 Jatropha cuneata Wiggins & Rollins – Limberbush, haat (pronounced )
 Jatropha curcas L. – Physic nut, piñoncillo, habb-el-melúk
 Jatropha dhofarica Radcl.-Sm.
 Jatropha dioica Sessé – Leatherstem
 Jatropha elliptica (Pohl) Oken
 Jatropha excisa Griseb.
 Jatropha gossypiifolia L. – Bellyache bush
 Jatropha hernandiifolia Vent. – Wild oilnut
 Jatropha integerrima Jacq. syn. J. pandurifolia – Spicy jatropha, called in Chinese "ri ri ying", which means "every-day-flowered cherry blossom"
 Jatropha macrantha Mull. Arg – Huanarpo macho or Peruvian Viagra
 Jatropha macrorhiza Benth. – Ragged nettlespurge
 Jatropha multifida L. – Coralbush
 Jatropha nudicaulis Benth.
 Jatropha podagrica Hook. – Buddha belly plant, bottleplant shrub
 Jatropha unicostata Balf.f.

Gallery

Formerly placed here 
Aleurites moluccanus (L.) Willd. (as J. moluccana L.)
Baliospermum montanum (Willd.) Müll.Arg. (as J. montana Willd.)
Cnidoscolus aconitifolius (Mill.) I.M.Johnst. (as J. aconitifolia Mill.)
Cnidoscolus angustidens Torr. (as J. angustidens (Torr.) Müll.Arg.)
Cnidoscolus quercifolius Pohl (as J. phyllacantha Müll.Arg.)
Cnidoscolus stimulosus (Michx.) Engelm. & A.Gray (as J. stimulosa Michx.)
Cnidoscolus texanus (Müll. Arg.) Small (as J. texana Müll.Arg.)
Cnidoscolus tubulosus (Müll. Arg.) I.M.Johnst. (as J. tepiquensis Costantin & Gallaud and J. tubulosa Müll.Arg.)
Cnidoscolus urens (L.) Arthur (as J. urens L.)
Hyaenanche globosa (Gaertn.) Lamb. (as J. globosa Gaertn.)
Manihot esculenta subsp. esculenta (as J. dulcis J.F.Gmel. and J. manihot L.)
Manihot carthagenensis subsp. carthagenensis (as J. carthagenensis Jacq.)
Manihot tripartita subsp. tripartita (as J. tripartita Spreng.)

Synonyms
 Adenorhopium Rchb.
 Adenoropium Pohl
 Castiglionia Ruiz & Pav.
 Collenucia Chiov.
 Curcas Adans.
 Jatropa Scop., orth. var.
 Loureira Cav.
 Mesandrinia Raf.
 Mozinna Ortega
 Zimapania Engl. & Pax

References

External links

 BBC News report of Jatropa Biofuel
  Case study report on the relationship with food security, provides references and background information.
 
 Any lessons for Ghana? India jatropha failure
 Jatropha not a miracle biofuel crop after all 
 

 
Euphorbiaceae genera
Taxa named by Carl Linnaeus